The 2002 M&M Meat Shops Canadian Open curling men's Grand Slam tournament was held December 12–15, 2002 at the Fort William Gardens in Thunder Bay, Ontario.

Edmonton's Kevin Martin rink won the event, defeating Ontario's Glenn Howard in the final, 8–4. Team Martin picked up $25,000 for the win. Martin's steal of one in the fourth proved to be a crucial turnout point, following two misses from Howard's third Richard Hart. Team Howard won $15,000. The total purse for the event was $100,000.

Teams
The teams were as follows:

Knockout brackets

A Event 
Scores:

B Event 
Scores:

C Event 
Scores:

Playoffs
The playoff bracket was as follows:

Notes

References

External links
Event site

2002 in Canadian curling
Curling in Northern Ontario
2003
2002 in Ontario
December 2002 sports events in Canada
Sports competitions in Thunder Bay